The Clayton Center is a performing arts and conference center in Clayton, North Carolina. The center is managed by the Town of Clayton and is located in the same complex as Town Hall at 111 East 2nd Street, Clayton. The venue serves patrons in Johnston County, North Carolina and beyond, drawing heavily from the Triangle area.

The building is the former Clayton Elementary School, which closed in 1997. The center was created through a public-private partnership between the Town of Clayton and the Clayton Cultural Arts Foundation. Fundraising support for the center is conducted through the Clayton Cultural Arts Foundation. The center opened in December 2002.

Receptions, trade shows and weddings are held in the center's main lobby adjacent to the glass atrium. Meeting rooms are located on the center's first and second floor. The center's 600-seat auditorium is available for large presentations, film screenings, concerts, pageants and other performing arts.

Among its many operations, The Clayton Center presents a Palladian Series each season featuring internationally touring artists.

Past performances

 Capitol Steps
 Voices of Glory
 David Sedaris
 Doc Watson
 Riders in the Sky
 Chris Thile
 The Flying Karamazov Brothers
 Harlem Gospel Choir
 Heartland
 Eileen Ivers
 James Gregory (comedian)
 Jesse Cook
 Jim Brickman
 B. J. Thomas
 Ricky Skaggs
 Shawn Colvin
 Kathy Mattea
 Johnny Winter
 Ruthie Foster
 Eric Bibb
 Mike Farris (musician)
 John Pizzarelli
 Blind Boys of Alabama
 Colin Hay
 Tommy Emmanuel
 Dianne Reeves
 James Cotton
 Robert Cray
 Jake Shimabukuro
 Ladysmith Black Mambazo
 Nanci Griffith

See also
 List of concert halls

External links
 The Clayton Center Official Site
 Town of Clayton Information on The Clayton Center

Music venues in North Carolina
Convention centers in North Carolina
Buildings and structures in Johnston County, North Carolina
Tourist attractions in Johnston County, North Carolina
Performing arts centers in North Carolina